The 1998 season was Molde's 23rd season in the top flight of Norwegian football. This season Molde competed in Tippeligaen, the Norwegian Cup and the UEFA Cup. From 13 April to 22 August, Molde were unbeaten in 26 consecutive matches in all competitions; a club record.

In Tippeligaen, Molde finished in 2nd position, 9 points behind winners Rosenborg. Molde was unbeaten throughout the first 21 matches in the league, a club record streak which was beaten in the 2014 season. Their first loss of the season came on 20 September when they were defeated 3–1 by Vålerenga in Oslo. In the following round, Molde played Rosenborg at home in a possibly league-defining game since Molde before the match was only one point behind Rosenborg. Molde lost the match with the score 0–1 in the game which, as of 2019, holds the record home attendance on Molde Stadion with 13,308 spectators.

Molde participated in the 1998 Norwegian Cup. Because of the World Cup, the Tippeligaen teams entered in the third round. They defeated Fana and Viking on their way to the quarterfinal vs. Brann. At Brann Stadion on 8 September 2000, Molde lost the quarterfinal with the score 0–4.

In the UEFA Cup, Molde was drawn against Bulgarian team CSKA Sofia in the second qualifying round. Molde drew the first leg at home ground with the score 0–0. CSKA Sofia won the second leg 2–0 at home and advanced to the next round 2–0 on aggregate.

Squad

As of end of season.

Friendlies

Competitions

Tippeligaen

Results summary

Positions by round

Results

League table

Norwegian Cup

Due to Norway's participation in the 1998 FIFA World Cup, the Tippeligaen clubs entered the competition in the third round.

UEFA Cup

Qualifying rounds

Squad statistics

Appearances and goals

               

|-
|colspan="14"|Players away from Molde on loan:
|-
|colspan="14"|Players who left Molde during the season:
|}

Goalscorers

See also
Molde FK seasons

References

External links
nifs.no

1998
Molde